Nor Rizah Ishak (born ) is a Malaysian female compound archer and part of the national team. She won the bronze medal at the 2015 Asian Archery Championships in the women's team event.

References

1969 births
Living people
Malaysian female archers
Place of birth missing (living people)
Archers at the 2010 Commonwealth Games
Commonwealth Games competitors for Malaysia